The NASA Pathfinder and NASA Pathfinder Plus were the first two aircraft developed as part of an evolutionary series of solar- and fuel-cell-system-powered unmanned aerial vehicles. AeroVironment, Inc. developed the vehicles under NASA's Environmental Research Aircraft and Sensor Technology (ERAST) program. They were built to develop the technologies that would allow long-term, high-altitude aircraft to serve as atmospheric satellites, to perform atmospheric research tasks as well as serve as communications platforms. They were developed further into the NASA Centurion and NASA Helios aircraft.

Pathfinder
AeroVironment initiated its development of full-scale solar-powered aircraft with the Gossamer Penguin and Solar Challenger vehicles in the late 1970s and early 1980s, following the pioneering work of Robert Boucher, who built the first solar-powered flying models in 1974. As part of the ERAST program, AeroVironment built four generations of long endurance unmanned aerial vehicles (UAVs) under the leadership of Ray Morgan, the first of which was the Pathfinder.

Development
In 1983, AeroVironment obtained funding from an unspecified US government agency to secretly investigate a UAV concept designated "High Altitude Solar" or HALSOL. The HALSOL prototype first flew in June 1983. Nine HALSOL flights took place at  Groom Lake in Nevada. The flights were conducted using radio control and battery power, as the aircraft had not been fitted with solar cells. HALSOL's aerodynamics were validated, but the investigation led to the conclusion that neither photovoltaic cell nor energy storage technology were mature enough to make the idea practical for the time being, and so HALSOL was put into storage.

In 1993, after ten years in storage, the aircraft was brought back to flight status for a brief mission by the Ballistic Missile Defense Organization (BMDO). With the addition of small solar arrays, five low-altitude checkout flights were flown under the BMDO program at NASA Dryden in the fall of 1993 and early 1994 on a combination of solar and battery power.

In 1994 the aircraft transferred to the NASA ERAST Program to develop science platform aircraft technology. It was renamed "Pathfinder" because it was "literally the pathfinder for a future fleet of solar-powered aircraft that could stay airborne for weeks or months on scientific sampling and imaging missions". In addition, the ERAST Project also wanted to determine the feasibility of such a UAV for carrying instruments used in a variety of scientific studies.

On October 21, 1995, the aircraft's fragility was aptly demonstrated when it was severely damaged in a hangar accident, but was subsequently rebuilt.

Aircraft description
Pathfinder was powered by eight electric motors — later reduced to six — which were first powered by batteries. Two underwing pods contain the landing gear, batteries, triple-redundant instrumentation system, and dual-redundant flight control computers. By the time the aircraft was adopted into the ERAST project in late 1993, solar cells were being added, eventually covering the entire upper surface of the wing. The solar arrays provide power for the aircraft's electric motors, avionics, communications and other electronic systems. Pathfinder also had a backup battery system that can provide power for between two and five hours to allow limited-duration flight after dark.

Pitch control is maintained by the use of tiny elevators on the trailing edge of the wing Turn and yaw control is accomplished by slowing down or speeding up the motors on the outboard sections of the wing.

Flight testing and records
Major science activities of Pathfinder missions have included detection of forest nutrient status, forest regrowth after damage caused by Hurricane Iniki in 1992, sediment/algal concentrations in coastal waters and assessment of coral reef health. Science activities are coordinated by the NASA Ames Research Center and include researchers at the University of Hawaii and the University of California. Pathfinder flight tested two ERAST-developed scientific instruments, a high spectral resolution Digital Array Scanned Interferometer (DASI) and a high spatial resolution Airborne Real-Time Imaging System (ARTIS), both developed at Ames.

On September 11, 1995, Pathfinder set an unofficial altitude record for solar powered aircraft of  during a 12-hour flight from NASA Dryden. This and subsequent records claimed by NASA for Pathfinder remain unofficial, as they were not validated by the FAI, the internationally recognized aviation world record sanctioning body.  The National Aeronautic Association presented the NASA-industry ERAST team with an award for one of the "10 Most Memorable Record Flights" of 1995.

After further modifications, the aircraft was moved to the U.S. Navy's Pacific Missile Range Facility (PMRF) on the Hawaiian island of Kauai. During those flights, Pathfinder carried two lightweight imaging instruments to learn more about the island's terrestrial and coastal ecosystems, demonstrating the potential of such aircraft as platforms for scientific research.

Pathfinder-Plus

During 1998, the Pathfinder was modified into the longer-winged Pathfinder-Plus configuration. The new center section was topped by more-efficient silicon solar cells developed by SunPower Corporation of Sunnyvale, California, which could convert almost 19 percent of the solar energy they receive to useful electrical energy to power the craft's motors, avionics and communication systems. That compared with about 14 percent efficiency for the older solar arrays that cover most of the surface of the mid- and outer wing panels from the original Pathfinder. Maximum potential power was boosted from about 7,500 watts on Pathfinder to about 12,500 watts on Pathfinder-Plus. The number of electric motors was increased to eight, and the motors used were more powerful units, designed for the follow-on aircraft.

The Pathfinder-Plus development flights flown at PMRF in the summer of 1998 validated power, aerodynamic, and systems technologies for its successor, the Centurion.

Atmospheric satellite tests
In July 2002 Pathfinder-Plus carried commercial communications relay equipment developed by Skytower, Inc., a subsidiary of AeroVironment, in a test of using the aircraft as a broadcast platform. Because of the aircraft's high lookdown angle, the transmission utilized only one watt of power, or 1/10,000 of the power required by a terrestrial tower to provide the same signal. According to Stuart Hindle, Vice President of Strategy & Business Development for SkyTower, "SkyTower platforms are basically geostationary satellites without the time delay." Further, Hindle said that such platforms flying in the stratosphere, as opposed to actual satellites, can achieve much higher levels of frequency use. "A single SkyTower platform can provide over 1,000 times the fixed broadband local access capacity of a geostationary satellite using the same frequency band, on a bytes per second per square mile basis."

Ray Morgan, president of AeroVironment, has described the concept as, "What we're trying to do is create what we call an 'atmospheric satellite,' which operates and performs many of the functions as a satellite would do in space, but does it very close in, in the atmosphere"

Specifications

See also
 Electric aircraft
 History of unmanned aerial vehicles
 Regenerative fuel cell

 NASA Centurion (First flight 10 November 1998)
 NASA/AeroVironment Helios Prototype (First flight 8 September 1999)
 QinetiQ/Airbus Zephyr (First flight in 2008)
 Facebook Aquila (First flight	28 June 2016)
 SoftBank/AeroVironment HAPSMobile (First flight 11 September 2019) 
 BAE Systems PHASA-35 (First flight 17 February 2020)

References
This article contains material that originally came from the web article "Unmanned Aerial Vehicles" by Greg Goebel, which exists in the Public Domain.

 "Photovoltaic Finesse: Better Solar Cells—with Wires Where the Sun Don't Shine", an article by Daniel Cho on page thirty-three of the September, 2003 issue of Scientific American

External links

 NASA's Helios Project
 Helios for kids
 Helios model by DesignsbyALX .
 Science Daily article on Pathfinder Plus altitude record
 Telecom relay achievements at Airport International
 Space.com article
 History of solar powered UAVs at The Future of Things
 Pathfinder Plus at NASM
 NASA-AeroVironment contract for followon projects
 Helios record attempt article
 NASA image collections:
 NASA Pathfinder 
 NASA Pathfinder Plus
 NASA Centurion
 NASA Helios Prototype

Pathfinder
NASA aircraft
Solar-powered aircraft
Unmanned aerial vehicles of the United States
1990s United States experimental aircraft
Six-engined tractor aircraft
Eight-engined tractor aircraft
Flying wings